Mandi Dabwali is a municipal committee town,  in Bathinda district and Sirsa district in the Indian state of Punjab  and Haryana.  It is located on the border of Haryana and Punjab.
It is at a distance of 60 km from Sirsa and 40 km from Bathinda, Punjab. Pin code of Mandi Dabwali is 125104 and STD code is 01668.

In the 2001 Census of India, Mandi Dabwali had a population of 53811. Males constituted 53% of the population and females 47%.

In the 2011 Census of India, Mandi Dabwali had a population of 269,929. Males constituted 141945 of the population and females 127984. Punjabi is the dominant language spoken by people.

Dabwali fire accident occurred on 23 December 1995 in which at about 442 people died mostly school children among them and another 160 were injured, half of them with serious burns. This tragic accident happened in Rajeev Marriage Palace during a function organized by a local DAV Public School. Now at the same place, there is a Library founded in the memory of those died ones.

The town has been a hub for manufacturing and marketing modified open jeeps since early 2000s.

Mandi Dabwali comes under Tehsil Dabwali which is also an assembly constituency [043].

Mandi Dabwali has a Railway Station which connects it to Bathinda (Punjab) and to Hanumangarh (Rajasthan). It is the only Station of Indian State Haryana Jodhpur-Bathinda Railway Line of Northern Western Railway.

The town has the facility of Indoor stadium named Guru Gobind Singh Stadium

The town has a college named Dr. B.R Ambedkar Govt College Mandi Dabwali. 
affiliated to Chaudhary Devi Lal University Sirsa.

Villages under Dabwali tehsil - Shergarh, Sakta Khera, Lohgarh, Choutala, Abub Shahar, Mangiana, Habuana, Alikan, Masitan, Moujgarh, Panniwala Ruldu, Nilanwali, lambi, moujgarh.

Notable people

 Sunil Grover, comedian and actor

See also
 Panniwala Ruldu

References

Cities and towns in Sirsa district